Thylacinus is a genus of extinct carnivorous marsupials from the order Dasyuromorphia. The only recent member was the thylacine (Thylacinus cynocephalus), commonly also known as the Tasmanian tiger or Tasmanian wolf. The last known Tasmanian tiger was in the Beaumaris Zoo in Tasmania, eventually passing away in 1936. Alleged sightings of the tiger were reported after its extinction, however, no photographs or physical proof have been found to support the claims. In the first half of the 20th century, an already dwindling thylacine population was exposed to a combination of excessive hunting by humans, as well as likely competition with introduced dogs. Other prehistoric species are known from this genus. An unidentified species is known from Pleistocene New Guinea. Thylacines emerged around four million years ago and were known to inhabit Australia before they disappeared, most likely due to competition with dingos. Their last known stronghold was in Tasmania before they became extinct due to European hunting.

Species

Genus Thylacinus
Thylacinus cynocephalus, also known as the thylacine (Early Pliocene to circa 1936)
Thylacinus macknessi (Lower Miocene)
Thylacinus megiriani (Upper Miocene/Lower Pliocene)
Thylacinus potens (Upper Miocene)
Thylacinus yorkellus (Upper Miocene/Lower Pliocene)
Thylacinus breviceps (?)

Below is a phylogeny by Yates (2015) on the relationships of Thylacinus.

{{clade| style=font-size:100%; line-height:100%
|label1=Thylacinus
|1=

References

External links
Prehistoric range of the Thylacinidae
Australian Thylacine
Various Links

Tasmanian Tiger

Dasyuromorphs
Extinct animals of Australia
Extinct marsupials
Marsupial genera
Taxa named by Coenraad Jacob Temminck
Holocene extinctions
Pleistocene first appearances